On the Trail: Inside the 2020 Primaries is a 2020 American political documentary film directed by Katie Hinman and Toby Oppenheimer. It is the first film to be released by CNN. The film premiered on August 6, 2020 on HBO Max.

Premise 
The film covers the journey of a veteran team of female journalists at CNN in the volatile environment of the 2020 Democratic Party presidential primaries. Starting just before the Iowa caucuses, the journalists are followed as they tackle what it takes to survive and become a top political reporter and adapt to life on the road.

References

External links 
 
 

2020 films
2020 documentary films
American documentary films
HBO Max films
2020s English-language films
2020s American films